The Black Mountain (黑山路 Hēi Shānlù "Black Mountain Road") is a 1994 film by Zhou Xiaowen, who served as the director and cinematographer. Like other films from this director, the narrative refers to sexuality and violence and the principal characters are males who are troubled. Ai Liya stars as the woman. Zhao Xiaorui is the elder brother. Xie Yuan is the sixth brother.

In the film, a woman whose name is not given in the film, lives in a makeshift inn and has porters as customers. One group of porters kills her husband and seizes her and her inn. Two of the porters fight over the woman and the property. One is stronger and a brute and the other is gentler and wants to convince the woman to be his wife.

An entry in Encyclopedia of Chinese Film stated that Zhou "uses beautiful camera work and mise-en-scène to convey the emotionally charged situation."

References
 Xiao, Zhiwei and Yingjin Zhang. Encyclopedia of Chinese Film. Taylor & Francis, June 1, 2002. , 9780203195550.

Notes

External links

 

1994 films
1994 drama films
Films directed by Zhou Xiaowen
Chinese drama films